New Sudan is a concept for restructuring the Sudanese state, which was proposed by the Sudan People's Liberation Army/Movement during the Second Sudanese Civil War. The original SPLA/M Manifesto outlined 'New Sudan' as a proposed united and secular Sudanese state. The vision of 'New Sudan' was developed by Dr. John Garang, who advocated the 'New Sudan' as a democratic and pluralistic state.

The 1994 National Convention of New Sudan (organized by SPLA/M) redefined 'New Sudan' as a system of governance for the regions under SPLA/M control. After John Garang's death in 2005 and the independence of South Sudan in 2011, the New Sudan discourse became a less prominent feature in Sudanese politics.

References

Second Sudanese Civil War
Sudan People's Liberation Movement
Sudanese democracy movements
Unionism